Mand, is a town located in Kech Makran, Kech District, southern Balochistan, a province of Pakistan.

Populated places in Kech District